HMS Kent was a batch-1  destroyer of the Royal Navy. She and her sisters were equipped with the Sea Slug Mk-1 medium-range surface-to-air missile SAM system, along with the short-range Sea Cat SAM, two twin 4.5-inch gun turrets, two single 20mm cannon, ASW torpedo tubes, and a platform and hangar that allowed her to operate one Wessex helicopter. The County class were large ships, with good seakeeping abilities and long range, and were ideal blue-water ships for their time.

Construction and design
Kent was one of two County-class destroyers ordered under the British Admiralty's 1956–57 shipbuilding programme. She was laid down at Harland & Wolff's Belfast shipyard on 1 March 1960 and launched by Princess Marina, Duchess of Kent on 27 September 1961. The ship was completed on 15 August 1963.

The ship was propelled by a combination of steam turbines and gas turbines in a Combined steam and gas (COSAG) arrangement, driving two propeller shafts.

A twin launcher for the Seaslug anti-aircraft missile was fitted aft. Up to 39 Seaslugs could be carried horizontally in a magazine that ran much of the length of the ship. Close-in anti-aircraft protection was provided by a pair of Seacat missile launchers, while two twin QF 4.5 inch Mark V gun mounts were fitted forward. A helicopter deck and hangar allowed a single Westland Wessex helicopter to be operated.

A Type 965 long-range air-search radar and a Type 278 height-finding radar was fitted on the ship's mainmast, with a Type 992 surface/low level air search and target indication radar and an array of ESM aerials were mounted on the ship's foremast. Type 901 fire control radar for the Seaslug missile was mounted aft. Type 184 sonar was fitted.

Operational service
After her commissioning and work-up, Kent spent the balance of her career as an escort to the Royal Navy's aircraft carrier fleet. She was hard worked throughout the 1960s, along with her batch-1 County sister ships, as they were the only guided missile-armed destroyers in the fleet until the latter half of the 1960s.

One role was as host ship for the Withdrawal from Empire negotiations in Gibraltar. She suffered a fire during refitting in 1976 but was soon repaired and was present for the Silver Jubilee fleet review of 1977.

In the late 1960s all four of the batch-1 County-class vessels were planned to be upgraded with the superior Sea Slug Mk-2 system, but the upgrades were cancelled in 1967–68 because the amount of time the ships would be out of the operational fleet while being refitted. However, some batch-2 improvements were made during mid life refits, including upgrading the Seacat system from GWS21 to GWS22 and fitting Type 992Q target indicator radar instead of Type 992. Kent was refitted from June 1969 to December 1972.

Decommissioning and harbour service
At the beginning of the Falklands War, she was surveyed for possible recommissioning (her large size, helicopter deck and four 4.5-inch guns would have made her a good command and shore bombardment ship), but her two years of unmaintained status meant a substantial amount of refit would be required to make her seaworthy, and no work was begun. 

In 1984 she also became a harbour training ship for the Sea Cadet Corps. She was paid off from this in 1987 and became a training hulk at Portsmouth until stricken in 1993, though she lingered on, tied up to the same pier at Portsmouth Naval Base until 1996.

Kent was sold for scrap, and in 1998 she was towed to India to be broken up.

Commanding officers
Notable commanding officers include Iwan Raikes in 1968, Richard P Clayton between 1968 and 1969 and Jock Slater in 1976–1977.

References

Publications

External links 

 

County-class destroyers of the Royal Navy
1961 ships
Cold War destroyers of the United Kingdom
Ships built in Belfast